A Single Scope Background Investigation (SSBI) is a type of United States security clearance investigation. It involves investigators or agents interviewing past employers, coworkers and other individuals associated with the subject of the SSBI. It is governed by the U.S. Intelligence Community Policy Guidance Number 704.1. 

Standard elements include background checks of employment, education, organization affiliations and any local agency where the subject has lived, worked, traveled or attended school. These checks lead to interviews with persons who know the subject both personally and professionally. The investigation may include a National Agency Check with Local Agency Check and Credit Check (NACLC) of the subject's spouse or cohabitant. Previous background investigations conducted on the subject may also be reviewed to corroborate the information obtained or disclosed within the new SSBI.

The Standard Form 86 (SF86) is required to begin the background check process.

See also
 Yankee White

References

Espionage
National security
United States government secrecy
Classified information in the United States
United States Office of Personnel Management